The Florida Department of Health is responsible for protecting the public health and safety of the residents and visitors of the state of Florida. It is a cabinet-level agency of the state government, headed by a state surgeon general who reports to the governor. The department has its headquarters in Tallahassee.

History

During the 1996 legislative session, the beleaguered Florida Department of Health and Rehabilitative Services was reconstructed as two entities: the Department of Health and the Florida Department of Children and Families.

The Florida Department of Health operates county health departments in all 67 of the state's counties. The agency employs more than 17,000 persons. It has worked on two-year-old immunizations, tobacco control, and statewide preparedness response efforts.

The Florida Department of Health is responsible for public health, including:

Epidemiology
Investigating foodborne illness and zoonotic and waterborne diseases
Emergency preparedness and bioterrorism
Controlling communicable disease
Health promotion and education
School health. The department manages the school health services program in cooperation with the Florida Department of Education. Funding comes from a variety of sources, including DOH and local school districts.
Women's health
Public health dentistry and oral health
Nutrition
Vaccinations/preventable disease
Eliminating health disparities
Provision of vital records
Environmental health
Medical Quality Assurance
Epilepsy
Chronic disease
Spinal cord injury prevention programs

COVID-19 
On 15 February, 2023, the department published a safety alert from the State Surgeon General Joseph Ladapo warning of “a novel increase” in adverse event reports related to mRNA-based COVID-19 vaccines.

References

External links

Official website
Florida Department of Health Salaries
Verifying Florida physician license online

 
State agencies of Florida
State departments of health of the United States
World Digital Library